Ha-Comedy Store (Hebrew: הקומדי סטור, 'The Comedy Store') was an Israeli entertainment program which was broadcast on the Israeli  Channel 2 between the years 1994-1996. In its prime it starred Zvika Hadar, Assaf Ashtar, Ruby Duenyas, Gil Sassover and Itai Segev.

The show scheduled weekly consisted different short nonsense styled skits including recurring nooks, such as "JoJo Ticked-Off" (החלסטרה של ז'וז'ו, HaKhalastra shel Zhozho) and "Jacques' Bulletin" (המבזק של ז'ק, HaMivzak shel Zhak) and music segments which were mostly parodies of famous Israeli songs.

During the first seasons, the show won a great success, and coined a number of unique expressions to the Hebrew language such as "Laflaf" (לפלף, 'nerd'; plural 'laflafim' לפלפים), "Khalastra" (חלסטרה, a slang word used by 'JoJo' to describe his resent and anger at various things on his nook 'JoJo Ticked-Off'). The character which is mostly remembered and identified with the show is apparently Jojo Halastra, played by Tzvika Hadar, which was a parody on the Israeli Ars.

In 1995 a "Ha-Comedy Store" album was released containing all of the most popular songs and skits.

After the third season the shows' popularity descended after some of the actors left the show.

Cast
Zvika Hadar
Assaf Ashtar
Ruby Duenyas
Gil Sassover
Itai Segev
Erez Ben Harush
Lior Halfon
Yaniv Katzir
Rubi Moskovitz
Arik Silbermann

See also 
 Jojo Khalastra

External links

Israeli television shows
Channel 2 (Israeli TV channel) original programming
1990s Israeli television series
1994 Israeli television series debuts
1996 Israeli television series endings